Injoux-Génissiat is a commune in the Ain department in eastern France.
The village is beside the Génissiat Dam, a major hydro-electric dam on the Rhône.

Politics and administration

Population

See also
Communes of the Ain department

References

Communes of Ain
Ain communes articles needing translation from French Wikipedia